Grasshopper is a 1982 album by J. J. Cale. It was his seventh studio album since his debut in 1971.

Recording
After recording five albums in the seventies, Cale moved from Nashville to California and released Shades in 1981.  Produced by Audie Ashworth, the album, like the majority of Cale's releases, was not a commercial success, although the Oklahoma singer-songwriter had a loyal cult following among fans and fellow musicians.  Backed by the usual top session musicians, including Reggie Young, Ken Buttrey, and David Briggs, Grasshopper has a slicker, more radio-friendly sound than Cale's previous album, as is evident in the opening track "City Girls," where "a poor boy" longs for a city beauty but "can’t afford no diamond rings or all them other fancy things."  In his AllMusic review of the LP, William Ruhlmann notes, "J.J. Cale drifts toward a more pop approach on this album, starting with the lead-off track, ‘City Girls,’ which could almost but not quite be a hit single. The usual blues and country shuffle approach is in effect, but Audie Ashworth's production is unusually sharp, the playing has more bite than usual, and Cale, whose vocals are for the most part up in the mix, sounds more engaged."
	
Grasshopper was recorded in studios in Nashville and North Hollywood.  Cale’s previous albums were studies in diversity, touching on a variety of musical styles that make up what would become known as Americana, and Grasshopper, while a more polished production, continues this exploration.  Cale accompanies himself on the folk song "Drifter’s Wife," displaying some impressive finger picking, and returns to the theme of a musician's rootless life on the road.  The straight love song "You Keep Me Hangin’ On" begins with a piano introduction reminiscent of Elton John, unusual for a Cale recording, and contains vulnerable lyrics to a longed-for lover.  There are also two instrumentals, including the title track, which uses steel drums, and "Dr. Jive," which displays the talents of vibraphonist Farrell Morris.

Several songs have an optimistic and upbeat feel, such as "Don’t Wait" ("Don't wait for the good times to come, we got 'em right here, we’re on the run…") and the jaunty "Nobody But You."  The fast tempo boogie "Devil in Disguise" begins with Chuck Berry-type lyrics in the first verse before introducing a girl who has "rock and roll way down in her soul" but who "wants to know where's the limousine" and features an infectious hi-hat ride prominently on the choruses.  The song's title recalls the 1963 hit by Elvis Presley, one of Cale's biggest influences. "Downtown L.A." paints a seedy portrait of urban decadence and decay, "a depressing place," as Cale puts it, while the ominous beginning of "Mississippi River" introduces a story of a man desperate to get back to Memphis ‘to get my baby back."  "One Step Ahead of the Blues," co-written with fellow Oklahoma musician Roger Tillison, might best reflect Cale's general outlook on the music business and the trappings of fame, opening defiantly with the lines "I ain’t high on cocaine, I don’t need the pain, it’s bad for your brain and that’s true," and later declaring "I don't run with the crowd, I don't talk big and loud…"  For years Cale had turned down opportunities that might have helped his record sales, whether they were television appearances or tours, preferring to guide his career as he saw fit.  In the 2005 documentary To Tulsa and Back, he states:

In 2013, he reflected, "…I knew what fame entailed. I tried to back off from that. I had seen some of the people I was working with forced to be careful because people wouldn’t leave them alone…What I’m saying, basically, is I was trying to get the fortune without having the fame."

Band member and wife Christine Lakeland co-wrote the bluesy dirge "Does Your Mama Like to Reggae" as well as "Don’t Wait."

Track listing 

All tracks written by J. J. Cale, except where noted.

 "City Girls"
 "Devil in Disguise"
 "One Step Ahead of the Blues" (J. J. Cale, Roger Tillison)
 "You Keep Me Hangin' On"
 "Downtown L.A."
 "Can't Live Here"
 "Grasshopper"
 "Drifters Wife"
 "Don't Wait" (J. J. Cale, Christine Lakeland)
 "A Thing Going On"
 "Nobody But You"
 "Mississippi River"
 "Does Your Mama Like to Reggae" (J. J. Cale, Christine Lakeland)
 "Dr. Jive"

Personnel 

J. J. Cale – vocals, electric guitar, slide guitar (tr. 1), bass, vocals (tr. 2), electric guitar, vocals ( tr. 3, 4, 6, 9, 11, 13), electric guitar, gut-string guitar, vocals (tr. 5), electric guitar (tr. 7, 14), guitar, vocals (tr. 8), electric guitar, organ, vocals (tr. 12)
Reggie Young – electric guitar (tr. 1) rhythm guitar (tr. 14)
Christine Lakeland – electric guitar, organ (tr. 5), vocals, guitar, organ (tr. 10), electric guitar (tr. 11), rhythm guitar, percussion (tr. 12), percussion (tr. 13)
David Briggs – piano (tr. 3, 4, 6, 13), electric piano (tr.1
Mike Lawler – synthesizer (tr. 3, 13)
Jim Karstein – congas (tr. 5)
Bill Boatman - tambourine (tr. 5), drums (tr. 2, 5, 10, 12)
Terry McMillan - harmonica (tr. 9)
Robert Greenidge – steel drums (tr. 7)
Gary Allen – drums (tr. 11)
Charles Dungey – bass guitar (tr. 14)
Farrell Morris – congas, vibraphone (tr. 14)
Karl Himmel – drums (tr. 7, 14)
Nick Rather – bass guitar (tr. 5, 10, 11, 12)
Tommy Cogbill – bass guitar (tr. 1, 3, 6, 7, 13 
Ken Buttrey – drums (tr. 3, 6, 13)
Steve Gibson – electric guitar (tr. 3, 6, 13)
Johnny Christopher – rhythm guitar (tr. 1, 3, 4, 6, 13)
Bobby Emmons – organ (tr. 1, 3, 4, 6, 13)
Bob Moore - bass (tr. 9)
Buddy Harman - drums (tr. 9)
Harold Bradley - electric guitar (tr. 9)
Tony Migliori - piano (tr. 9)
Ray Edenton -  rhythm guitar (tr.9)
Dennis Solee - horns
Technical
Audie Ashworth – producer, engineer
Chad Hailey – engineer, mixer
Chip Young – engineer
Rick Horton – engineer
Ron Reynolds – engineer, mixer

References 

1982 albums
J. J. Cale albums
Albums produced by Audie Ashworth